The Fourflusher is a 1928 American silent comedy film directed by Wesley Ruggles and starring George J. Lewis, Marion Nixon and Eddie Phillips. It was produced and distributed by the Universal Pictures. It is a surviving film.

Cast
George J. Lewis as Andy Wittaker
Marion Nixon as June Allen
Eddie Phillips as Robert Riggs
Churchill Ross as Jerry
Jimmie Ayre as Toni
Burr McIntosh as Ira Wittaker
Otto Hoffman as Mr. Riggs
Wilfrid North as Mr. Stone
Knute Erickson as Jeweler
Patricia Caron as Cashier
Miriam Fouche  
Hayden Stevenson

Preservation status
This film is preserved in the EYE Institut Filmmuseum Netherlands collection.

References

External links
 The Fourflusher at IMDb.com

1928 films
American silent feature films
Films directed by Wesley Ruggles
Universal Pictures films
American black-and-white films
1920s English-language films
1928 comedy-drama films
1920s American films
Silent American comedy-drama films